The following is a list of notifiable diseases arranged by country.

Bacteria

Virus

Other/multiple

References 

Notifiable diseases
Health law